Mahdi Jassim (born 4 March 1956) is an Iraqi former football midfielder who played for Iraq at the 1977 FIFA World Youth Championship and 1985 Pan Arab Games.

Mahdi played for the national team between 1980 and 1986.

Career statistics

International goals
Scores and results list Iraq's goal tally first.

References

Iraqi footballers
Iraq international footballers
Living people
Association football midfielders
1956 births